Honorificabilitudinitatibus (honōrificābilitūdinitātibus) is the dative and ablative plural of the medieval Latin word honōrificābilitūdinitās, which can be translated as "the state of being able to achieve honours". It is mentioned by the character Costard in Act V, Scene I of William Shakespeare's Love's Labour's Lost.

As it appears only once in Shakespeare's works, it is a hapax legomenon in the Shakespeare canon. At  letters, it is the longest word in the English language which strictly alternates consonants and vowels.

Use in Love's Labour's Lost
The word is spoken by the comic rustic Costard in Act V, Scene 1 of the play. It is used after an absurdly pretentious dialogue between the pedantic schoolmaster Holofernes and his friend Sir Nathaniel. The two pedants converse in a mixture of Latin and florid English. When Moth, a witty young servant, enters, Costard says of the pedants:

Use in Baconianism
The word has been used by adherents of the Baconian theory who believe Shakespeare's plays were written in steganographic cypher by Francis Bacon. In 1905 Isaac Hull Platt argued that it was an anagram for hi ludi, F. Baconis nati, tuiti orbi, Latin for "these plays, F. Bacon's offspring, are preserved for the world". His argument was given wide circulation by Edwin Durning-Lawrence in 1910, complete with a cryptonumerical attempt to prove it justified. The anagram assumes that Bacon would have Latinized his name as "Baco" or "Bacon" (the genitive case of which is "Baconis") rather than, as Samuel Schoenbaum argues, "Baconus", with genitive "Baconi".

It is far from the only possible anagram. In 1898, Paget Toynbee noted that the word contains a glorification of Dante by himself as its letters could be rearranged to form the phrase Ubi Italicus ibi Danti honor fit (Where there is an Italian, there honour is paid to Dante). In the 1970s, John Sladek noted that the word could also be anagrammatized as I, B. Ionsonii, uurit [writ] a lift'd batch, thus "proving" that Shakespeare's works were written by Ben Jonson. In 2012, in a column for the Calcutta Telegraph, Stephen Hugh-Jones mocked it with the deliberately anachronistic "If I built it in, is author ID Bacon?", attributing this to a derisive William Shakespeare; and counter-"proved" that Shakespeare wrote Bacon by converting the latter's famous opening phrase "What is truth, said jesting Pilate..." into "Truth? A lasting jape. Hide it. WS".

Other uses
Long before Love's Labour's Lost, the word and its variants had been used by medieval and then Renaissance authors.

Medieval
The unusually long word had apparently already been in circulation among scholars by the time of Petrus Grammaticus, 8th-century Italian poet, deacon, grammarian, and Charlemagne's primary Latin teacher. It can be found in Codex Bernensis 522 (Burgerbibliothek of Berne, Cod. 522), an early-9th-century manuscript copy of his work.

Italian lexicographer Papias used it circa 1055.

Honorificabilitudo appears in a charter of 1187 by Ugone della Volta, second Archbishop of Genoa.

Various forms of the word were also discussed in Magnae Derivationes, an early etymological treatise of circa 1190 by Uguccione, Italian canon lawyer and Bishop of Ferrara:

It also appears in Ars poetica, treatise on rhetoric of circa 1208–1216 by English-born French scholar Gervase of Melkley:

Italian grammarian Johannes Balbus used the word in its complete form in his hugely popular 1286 Latin dictionary known as Catholicon (in 1460, it became one of the first books to be printed using Gutenberg's press). Quoting Uguccione, it says regarding honorifico:

A late-13th-century example can be found in an anonymous sermon in a manuscript in Bodleian Library (MS Bodl. 36, f. 131v).

In his linguistic essay De vulgari eloquentia (On eloquence in the vernacular) of circa 1302–1305 Dante, drawing on Uguccione's Magnae Derivationes, cites honorificabilitudinitate as an example of a word too long for the standard line in verse:

Honorificabilitudinitas occurs in De gestis Henrici septimi Cesaris (1313–1315), a book by the Italian poet Albertino Mussato which chronicled 1310–1313 Italian expedition of Henry VII, Holy Roman Emperor:

It was for this work that in 1315 the commune of Padua crowned Mussato as poet laureate; he was the first man to receive the honour since antiquity.

It is also found on an Exchequer record, in a hand of the reign of Henry VI (1422–1461).

The word appears in Adagia, an annotated collection of Greek and Latin proverbs, compiled by Dutch humanist Erasmus; he recalls a humorous couplet about a man called Hermes who was fond of using foot-and-a-half words:

First published in 1500, by Shakespeare's time it was a very popular book, widely used as a text-book in English schools. The couplet itself was a popular schoolboy joke, current both in Erasmus's and Shakespeare's times, and beyond.

In the foreword to his 1529 translation of Lucan, French humanist and engraver Geoffroy Tory used the word as an example of bad writing, citing the Hermes couplet.

It also occurs in the works of Rabelais and in The Complaynt of Scotland (1549).

The word in its various forms was frequently used as test of the pen by scribes. One example is found in a fourteenth-century Pavian codex. It may also be seen, with some additional syllables, scribbled on a page of a late-16th-century heraldic manuscript (British Library, MS Harley 6113). Alternative form in honorificabilitudinacionibus is attested from manuscripts in Bamberg (Bamberg State Library, Q.V.41) and Munich (Bavarian State Library, Cgm 541). Other examples include Erfurt O.23, Prague 211 (f. 255v), Bratislava II Q.64 (f. 27r), Pembroke 260 (flyleaf), and a manuscript of Hoccleve.

The word is also known from at least two inscriptions on medieval tableware. A small goblet inscribed with honorificabilitudinitatibus around it was found at Kirby Muxloe Castle in Leicestershire, England. A pewter cruet engraved with an abbreviated version of the word (honorificabiliut) next to the owner's name (Thomas Hunte) was unearthed in a well filled in 1476 during 1937 conservation works at Ashby de la Zouch Castle, also in Leicestershire. The cruet was cast around 1400 and is currently in Victoria and Albert Museum, London.

Modern

Shakespeare's times
The year after the publication of Love's Labours Lost it is used by English satirist Thomas Nashe in his 1599 pamphlet Nashe's Lenten Stuff:

Nashe is referring to the exotic medicinal plant Guaiacum, the name of which was also exotic to the English at that time, being the first Native American word imported into the English language.

The word also appears in John Marston's 1605 play The Dutch Courtesan, Act V, Scene II:

In John Fletcher's tragicomedy The Mad Lover of  1617 the word is used by the palace fool:

John Taylor ("The Water Poet") uses an even longer version of the word, honorificicabilitudinitatibus in the very first sentence of his 1622 pamphlet Sir Gregory Nonsence:

After Shakespeare
Following the tradition of medieval scholars, Charles du Cange included both honorificabilitudo and honorificabilitudinitatibus in his 1678 Latin lexicon Glossarium mediae et infimae Latinitatis, quoting Ugone della Volta and Albertino Mussato.

Thomas Blount listed the anglicized form of the word, honorificabilitudinity (defined as "honorableness"), among the 11,000 hard or unusual words in his 1656 Glossographia, the largest English dictionary at the time. The entry was quoted by Elisha Coles in An English Dictionary, published in 1676. It was also repeated by Nathan Bailey in his influential 1721 An Universal Etymological English Dictionary.

While honorificabilitudinitatibus was not included in Samuel Johnson's famous dictionary, Dr Johnson did comment on its length in his 1765 edition of The Plays of William Shakespeare:

Commenting on this, antiquarian Joseph Hunter wrote in 1845:

In 1858, Charles Dickens wrote an essay Calling Bad Names for the weekly magazine Household Words he edited at the time; it starts with the Love's Labour's Lost quote and uses it to satirize the scientific publications that use too many Latin words:

James Joyce also used this word in his mammoth 1922 novel Ulysses, during the Scylla and Charybdis episode; when Stephen Dedalus articulates his interpretation of Hamlet:

In 1993 U.S. News & World Report used the word in its original meaning with reference to a debate about new words' being used in the game of Scrabble:

In the American animated television series Pinky and the Brains 1995 episode "Napoleon Brainaparte", the word is defined as "with honorablenesses".

Jeff Noon 2001 book of experimental poetry, Cobralingus, used the fictional Cobralingus Engine to remix this word in the style of electronic music to create a prose poem entitled "Pornostatic Processor".

In the 2005 episode "Sick Days & Spelling" of the Nickelodeon TV show Ned's Declassified School Survival Guide, Ned Bigby enters the spelling bee, having easy words until he comes across the word "honorificabilitudinitatibus" and gives up.

In Suzanne Selfors' 2011 children's novel Smells Like Treasure, her spelling champion character, Hercules Simple, uses the word.

See also
 Antidisestablishmentarianism
 Floccinaucinihilipilification
 Longest word in English
 Longest words
 Pneumonoultramicroscopicsilicovolcanoconiosis
 Pseudopseudohypoparathyroidism
 Supercalifragilisticexpialidocious

Explanatory notes

Citations

General and cited references 

 Nathan Bailey (1721). An Universal Etymological English Dictionary. 1726 edition.
 Brian C. Ballentine (2010). How to Do Things with Hard Words: The Uses of Classical Borrowings in the English Renaissance. Doctoral thesis, Brown University.
 David Basch (2007). "Shakespearean Prayer". The Jewish Magazine.
 
 Thomas Blount (1656). Glossographia. 1972 facsimile edition.
 
 
 Elisha Coles (1676). An English Dictionary: Explaining the Difficult Terms that are used in Divinity, Husbandry, Physick, Phylosophy, Law, Navigation, Mathematicks, and Other Arts and Sciences. 1973 facsimile edition.
 
 Charles Dickens (1858). "Calling Bad Names", in Household Words, volume 18.
 Charles du Fresne, sieur du Cange (1678). Glossarium mediae et infimae Latinitatis. 1883–1887 edition (searchable version).
 
 
 
 
 
 
 Samuel Johnson (1755). A Dictionary of the English Language. 1785 edition.
 Samuel Johnson, George Steevens (1765). The Plays of William Shakespeare. 1801 edition.
 James Joyce (1922). Ulysses. online.
 
 Deborah J. Leslie, Benjamin Griffin (2003). Transcription of Early Letter Forms in Rare Materials Cataloging.
 Falconer Madan, Edmund Craster (1922). A summary catalogue of Western manuscripts in the Bodleian Library at Oxford. Volume II, part 1.
 
 Giovanni Nencioni (1967). "Dante e la Retorica", in Dante e Bologna nei tempi di Dante.
 Notes and Queries (1881). Series 6, volume IV.
 Nicholas Royle (2010). "The distraction of 'Freud': Literature, Psychoanalysis and the Bacon-Shakespeare Controversy", in Shakespeare and His Authors: Critical Perspectives on the Authorship Question.
 Richard Sharpe (1996). "Vocabulary, Word Formation, and Lexicography", in: F. A. C. Mantello and A. G. Rigg (editors), Medieval Latin: An Introduction and Bibliographical Guide. Washington, D.C.: CUA Press. .
 
 
 Geoffroy Tory (1529). La Table de l'ancien philosophe Cebes. Scans online at Bavarian State Library.
 
 
 
 
 Henry William Weber (1812). The Works of Beaumont and Fletcher, volume 4.
 Rosemary Weinstein (2011). The Archaeology of Pewter Vessels in England 1200-1700: A Study of Form and Usage. Doctoral thesis, Durham University.

External links 
 
 
 

Baconian theory of Shakespeare authorship
English words
Latin words and phrases
Long words
Love's Labour's Lost
Shakespearean phrases
William Shakespeare